Velenice is name of several locations in the Czech Republic: 
Velenice (Česká Lípa District) 
Velenice (Nymburk District) 
 České Velenice